Franz Xaver Zinner (19 July 1902 – 16 December 1979) was a German weightlifter. He competed at the 1928 Summer Olympics in the middleweight category (under 75 kg) and finished in fourth place. Between 1923 and 1928 he set six unofficial middleweight world records: four in the snatch, one in the clean and jerk, and one in the total.

References

1902 births
1979 deaths
Olympic weightlifters of Germany
Weightlifters at the 1928 Summer Olympics
German male weightlifters
Sportspeople from Würzburg